A Celor lens (also known as a symmetric dialyte) is a highly corrected lens of the Dialyt type, designed for process photography, involving reproduction at or near 1:1 scale.

It was developed in 1898 by Emil von Hoegh, an optical designer working for the German company Goerz.

References 

Photographic lenses